Ravenswood Historic District may refer to:

East Ravenswood Historic District, Chicago, IL, listed on the NRHP in Illinois
Ravenswood Manor Historic District, Chicago, IL, listed on the NRHP in Illinois
Ravenswood "Old Town" Historic District, Ravenswood, WV, listed on the NRHP in West Virginia